Augustus High (September 7, 1844 – September 22, 1927) was an American politician in the state of Washington. He served in the Washington State Senate from 1897 to 1901. From 1899 to 1901, he was President pro tempore of the Senate.

References

Democratic Party Washington (state) state senators
1844 births
1927 deaths